Hewitt V. "Hoots" Lounsbury (February 22, 1911 – January 9, 1971) was an American engineer and politician.  Lounsbury served as the mayor of Anchorage, Alaska from 1958 to 1959, following the resignation of Anton Anderson for health reasons.

Hewitt V. Lounsbury was born in St. Paul, Minnesota on February 22, 1911.  He came to the then-territory of Alaska in May 1944 with the U.S. Army Corps of Engineers.  In 1949, he founded Lounsbury and Associates, a surveying and engineering firm.  He died at the age of 59 on January 9, 1971, in Honolulu, Hawaii.

He had three sons with his wife, Ester: Loren H., Joel and Jon.  Loren Lounsbury followed in his father's footsteps in both business and politics.  He opened up his own engineering and surveying firm, has served on the board of directors of First National Bank Alaska since 1976, and also briefly served in the gubernatorial cabinet of Bill Sheffield.

References

External links
 Alaska's Digital Archives The Anchorage city council, as photographed by Ward W. Wells at their September 29, 1959 meeting.  Mayor Lounsbury is at center.
 Lounsbury and Associates company history

1911 births
1971 deaths
20th-century American engineers
Businesspeople from Alaska
Mayors of Anchorage, Alaska
Businesspeople from Saint Paul, Minnesota
20th-century American politicians
Politicians from Saint Paul, Minnesota
20th-century American businesspeople